Selenophorus opalinus is a species of ground beetle in the family Carabidae. It is found in North America.

References

Further reading

 

Harpalinae
Beetles of North America
Beetles described in 1863
Taxa named by John Lawrence LeConte
Articles created by Qbugbot